"You'll Be Mine" is a short song, composed by Lennon–McCartney in the Beatles' early years, then known as the Quarrymen. It was a humorous parody of vocal jazz group The Ink Spots. It consists of Paul McCartney singing in a deep baritone, offset with shrill falsetto backing vocals by John Lennon, and guitar strumming. The lead vocal sings, in rather confused lyrics, about his determination of making a woman his; while the falsettos wail the last word of each sentence. About halfway through the song, Lennon gives a mock-bass voice spoken interlude about how, when the woman brought him toast one morning, he looked into her eyes and saw a "National Health Eyeball", then proceeded to love her like he has never done before. The song rises to a crescendo of wailing and bellowing, then fades out in laughter. To add to the confusion, the song is very difficult to understand; clicks, buzzes, fuzz, giggling, and the baritone voice obscure the lyrics.

Recorded in the McCartney family bathroom in 1960, it is the earliest recording attributed to the Lennon–McCartney songwriting partnership to be officially released. Along with the other songs recorded on that day, it is one of the few known Beatles recordings to feature Stuart Sutcliffe on bass.

Personnel
Paul McCartney – lead vocal, guitar
John Lennon – backing and spoken vocals, guitar
George Harrison – guitar
Stuart Sutcliffe – bass
Personnel per Mark Lewisohn

References

The Beatles songs
Song recordings produced by George Martin
Songs written by Lennon–McCartney
1995 songs
The Quarrymen songs
The Beatles Anthology